The Parti indépendantiste (English: Independentist Party) was a provincial party which advocated Quebec sovereignty in Québec, Canada in the second half of the 1980s.

Denis Monière

Founded by Denis Monière in 1985, the party was established to promote the separation of Québec from Canada. It attracted a number of purs et durs supporters of the Parti Québécois (PQ), who believed the party was not taking a strong enough position in promoting the cause of Québec independence.

Monière had previously been interim leader of the Parti nationaliste du Québec, a federal political party, following the resignation of the party’s founder.  Monière was defeated in the 1984 Canadian election that brought Brian Mulroney to power.

Under Monière's leadership, the Parti indépendantiste's influence failed to gain momentum. The party received less than one percent of the vote in the 1985 election.

Gilles Rhéaume

Gilles Rhéaume became party leader in 1987.  During his tenure, the party became radicalized and divided over strategy. Jacques Parizeau succeeded Pierre-Marc Johnson as leader of the PQ on March 18, 1988, and took a stronger stance on sovereignty.  Many Parti indépendantiste supporters returned to the PQ fold.

Rhéaume resigned on January 8, 1990, and the Parti indépendantiste lost its registration on June 15 of the same year.

Leaders of the Parti indépendantiste

 Denis Monière (1985-1987)
 Gilles Rhéaume (1987-1990)

Election results

See also

 Politics of Quebec
 List of Quebec general elections
 List of Quebec premiers
 List of Quebec leaders of the Opposition
 National Assembly of Quebec
 Timeline of Quebec history
 Political parties in Quebec
 Secessionist movements of Canada

Footnotes

External links
 National Assembly historical information
 La Politique québécoise sur le Web

Provincial political parties in Quebec
Political parties established in 1985
Defunct secessionist organizations in Canada
Defunct political parties in Canada
1985 establishments in Quebec